Gianluca Rinaldini (born 10 August 1959) is a former professional tennis player from Italy.

Career
In 1981, Rinaldini appeared in the French Open and Wimbledon Championships but was beaten in the opening round at both events, by Pavel Složil and Tim Gullikson respectively.

Rinaldini had wins over Alejandro Gattiker, Georges Goven and Sergio Casal en route to the semi-finals of the 1982 Florence Open, where he was beaten by eventual champion Vitas Gerulaitis.

The Italian played in both the men's singles and men's doubles draws at the 1983 French Open. In the singles, he was defeated in the first round by Australian John Alexander and he was also unable to progress into the second round in the doubles, with partner Claudio Panatta.

Accident
On 28 September 1985, Rinaldini was seriously injured in a car accident near his hometown of Faenza, caused by an exploding tyre. His car crashed into a guardrail and he suffered a cracked vertebrae. The accident left him with paralysis and he has been using a wheelchair ever since.

Personal
He is the father of Mattia Rinaldini, a footballer who played mostly for A.S. Varese and A.C. Prato.

Challenger titles

Singles: (1)

References

1959 births
Living people
Italian male tennis players
People with paraplegia
People from Faenza
Sportspeople from the Province of Ravenna